James "Jimmy Jam" Joseph (born  in Utica, New York) is an American wheelchair curler.

He participated in the 2006, 2010  and 2014 Winter Paralympics where American team finished on seventh, fourth and fifth places respectively.

Teams

References

External links 

 Jimmy JOSEPH | Wheelchair Curling | United States - Sochi 2014 Paralympic winter Games (web archive)
Profile at the Official Website for the 2010 Winter Paralympics in Vancouver

Living people
1962 births
Sportspeople from Utica, New York
American male curlers
American disabled sportspeople
American wheelchair curlers
Paralympic wheelchair curlers of the United States
Wheelchair curlers at the 2006 Winter Paralympics
Wheelchair curlers at the 2010 Winter Paralympics
Wheelchair curlers at the 2014 Winter Paralympics